Clarkston Hines (born March 21, 1967) is a retired American football player.

Hines graduated from Bolles School in Jacksonville, Florida. While at Bolles, he was an all-state selection in both football and basketball.

He then attended Duke University, where he was an All-American football player. In 1989. he caught an ACC-record 17 touchdown passes and was named the ACC Football Offensive Player of the Year. He led the conference in receiving for three consecutive years in 1987, 1988 and 1989, and completed his career holding conference marks in pass receptions (189), reception yardage (3,318) and touchdown receptions (38). He was also named the 1990 ACC Male Athlete of the Year.

After graduating from Duke, Hines was a ninth round selection of the Buffalo Bills in the 1990 NFL Draft.

Clarkston was the Vice President of DaVita Inc. Before opening PMI of Charlotte, Clarkston Hines spent 20 plus years in the corporate world in various leadership roles. For eight years, he was in a VP role leading a $275 Million operating division with over 1,100 employees for a Fortune 500 service company. Additionally, Clarkston led a team that managed over $400 Million in properties and assets in 11 states.

Clarkston was a three-time all conference and two-time All-American football player for Duke University. In 1989, he was named the ACC Football Offensive Player of the Year. He was also named the 1990 ACC Male Athlete of the Year. Other honors include being inducted into the Duke Athletics Hall of Fame (1999), named to the ACC 50th Anniversary Football Team (2003), and inducted into the College Football Hall of Fame (2010). Clarkston was a member of the 1990 Buffalo Bills team that played in Super Bowl XXV.

Clarkston lives in the Lake Norman area with his wife, their four children, three dogs and two cats. In his free time, he likes to work out, keep up with current events, and follow his favorite sports teams. He is also an active member of his local church. He and his wife Kathy reside in Statesville, North Carolina, with their four children.

He was elected into the College Football Hall of Fame in 2010.

References

External links
 

1967 births
Living people
All-American college football players
American football wide receivers
College Football Hall of Fame inductees
Duke Blue Devils football players
People from Chapel Hill, North Carolina
Players of American football from North Carolina
Raleigh–Durham Skyhawks players